Empresa Periodística La Nación S.A. is a Chilean state-owned media company, currently in liquidation.

It was founded on 4 January 1917 by Eliodoro Yáñez. It remained a private company until July 1927, when, during the dictatorship of Carlos Ibáñez, it was expropriated. Since that date, 69% of its property has remained in the hands of the Chilean government.

Media properties

Newspapers
 La Nación (printed 1917–2010, continued online as lanacion.cl)
 Diario Oficial de la República de Chile (Official Journal of the Republic of Chile; created in 1876 and edited by the National Press; Empresa Periodística La Nación S.A. put in charge of printing 1931–1934 and assumed direct control in 1934)
  (evening paper, 1922–1931, 1953–1955)
  (free evening paper, 2001–2002)
 El Nortino de Iquique (1991–2003)

Magazines
 La Fusta (equestrian magazine, 1975–present)
  (sports magazine, 1986–present

Other media and businesses
 Radio La Nación
 Gráfica Puerto Madero (printed graphic material, brochures, and private periodicals; since 2012 these have been printed by Copesa presses)
 Primera Línea (online newspaper – www.primeralinea.cl, 2001–2003)
 Via Directa (publication distribution company with "Ojos de Papel" outlets in Santiago Metro stations, 1983–present)

References

External links
 
La Nación 
Vía Directa 

1917 establishments in Chile
Former state media
Mass media companies of Chile
Mass media companies established in 1917